The MasterCard Classic Honoring Alejo Peralta was a golf tournament for professional female golfers, played on the LPGA Tour. It was played each year between 2005 and 2009 at Bosque Real Country Club in Mexico City, Mexico.

Winners

* Championship won in sudden-death playoff.

Tournament records

References

External links
LPGA official tournament microsite

Former LPGA Tour events
Golf tournaments in Mexico
Sports competitions in Mexico City
Recurring sporting events established in 2005
Recurring sporting events disestablished in 2009
2005 establishments in Mexico
2009 disestablishments in Mexico
Women's sport in Mexico